Patrizia Barbieri (born 8 May 1960) is an Italian politician.

Biography
Barbieri was born in Cremona, Italy, and she graduated in law at University of Parma. She has a law firm together with some partners in Piacenza, where she works as a civil lawyer and as a freelancer. She resides in Castelvetro Piacentino, a little town where she was Mayor from 20 november 1994 to 26 may 2003 (two consecutive terms). She is married and has two daughters. On 4 March 2020 Barbieri announced she had tested positive for SARS-CoV-2. Supported by Lega Nord, Forza Italia, Brothers of Italy and Lista civica, she won the 2017 Piacenza mayoral election and then officially took office on 28 June 2017 as Mayor of Piacenza for a first five-year term (renewable once). Through second degree elections - ie through indirect elections reserved for local administrators (Mayors and Councilors of Municipalities of the territory) - on 31 October 2018 was elected - maintaining simultaneously her role as Mayor, as required by Delrio Law - also President of the Province of Piacenza for a first four-year term (renewable once). She decided on 16 February 2022 to run (supported again by Lega Nord, Forza Italia, Brothers of Italy and Lista civica) for a second, and last, five-year term as Mayor of Piacenza in the 2022 election: Barbieri lost re-election on 26 June with 46,54% of votes against Katia Tarasconi (PD) in the run-off and she officially left office on 29 June: as established by the Delrio Law, with the loss of the role of Mayor Barbieri lost also the Presidency of the Province which is held ad interim by the Vicepresident Franco Albertini pending the regular election at the expiry of the mandate, scheduled for September.

References

External links 
 Patrizia Barbieri – Official site
 Municipality of Piacenza – official card of the Mayor

Living people
1960 births
Politicians from Cremona
21st-century Italian politicians
University of Parma alumni
Mayors of places in Emilia-Romagna
People from Piacenza
Presidents of the Province of Piacenza
Women mayors of places in Italy
Independent politicians in Italy
21st-century Italian women